Jay Soni is an Indian actor and host. He is known for his roles in television shows like Dharti Ka Veer Yodha Prithviraj Chauhan, Sasural Genda Phool and Sanskaar - Dharohar Apno Ki. He was also a contestant on reality shows like Jhalak Dikhhla Jaa 5 and Nach Baliye 7. He made his digital debut with Vikram Bhatt's web series Twisted 3.

Personal Life 
Jay Soni married Pooja Shah on 18 February 2014. On 18 April 2018, their daughter was born, whom they named as Aradheea Soni.

Filmography

Films

Television

Awards and nominations

See also 

 List of Indian television actors
 List of Indian film actors

References

External links 

Living people
Indian male soap opera actors
Gujarati people
People from Navsari district
Male actors from Gujarat
1986 births